Bernat Guillem de Montpeller also known as Bernat Guillem I d'Entença (Spanish:Bernardo Guillermo I de Entenza. b. ? - d. El Puig, 1238) was a noble of the Catalan House of Entença. He was the lord of Fraga. He is best known for his participation in the Conquest of Majorca and Valencia during the Reconquista. He died after the Battle of the Puig in 1238.

Biography 

In July 1215, he received the barony of Fraga, together with the possession of other castles ceded by his brother, Guillem d'Entença. Previously, parts of Fraga were shared with the Count of Urgell and the Viscount of Béarn. The king returned rent money that had gone to Urgell back to Fraga and Entença in 1215.

He participated with James I of Aragon in the conquests of Mallorca and Valencia. He commanded the king's forces at the Siege of Burriana where he was injured. He died in camp at the Battle of the Puig from wounds received in battle. His son, Bernat Guillem II d'Entença would inherit his possessions.

References

Bibliography

 
 

Year of birth missing
1238 deaths
Spanish untitled nobility
People of the Reconquista
13th-century Catalan people